The 1995 World Badminton Grand Prix was the 13th edition of the World Badminton Grand Prix finals. It was held in Singapore, from November 29 to December 3, 1995.

Final results

References
Smash: World Grand Prix Finals, Singapore 1995

World Grand Prix
World Badminton Grand Prix
B
Badminton tournaments in Singapore
1995 in Singaporean sport